Ei Iida (born 9 September 1967) is a former professional tennis player from Japan.

Biography
Iida qualified for the singles main draw of two Grand Slam tournaments, the 1988 Australian Open and 1989 US Open. Her first-round opponent at the US Open was Martina Navratilova, who went on to make the final.

As a doubles player, she reached No. 44 in the world and won one WTA Tour title, the 1993 Japan Open, partnering Maya Kidowaki.

Early in her career, she played collegiate tennis for Pepperdine University in the United States.

WTA career finals

Doubles: 1 (1 title)

ITF Circuit finals

Singles: 5 (3–2)

Doubles: 22 (14–8)

References

External links
 
 

1967 births
Living people
Japanese female tennis players
Pepperdine Waves women's tennis players
20th-century Japanese women
21st-century Japanese women